The Source is a lost 1918 American drama silent film directed by George Melford and written by Monte M. Katterjohn and Clarence Budington Kelland. The film stars Wallace Reid, Ann Little, Theodore Roberts, Raymond Hatton, James Cruze, Noah Beery, Sr. and Nina Byron. The film was released on September 8, 1918, by Paramount Pictures.

Plot
As described in a contemporary newspaper, the story is about a bad man who finds his way based on the disdain of a lovely young girl.

Cast
Wallace Reid as Van Twiller Yard
Ann Little as Svea Nord
Theodore Roberts as Big John Beaumont
Raymond Hatton as Pop Sprowl
James Cruze as Langlois
Noah Beery, Sr. as John Nord
Nina Byron as Ruth Piggins
Charles West as Paul Holmquist
Gustav von Seyffertitz as Ekstrom 
Charles Ogle as 'Sim-Sam' Samuels (*Charles Stanton Ogle)

References

External links 
 

1918 films
1910s English-language films
Silent American drama films
1918 drama films
Paramount Pictures films
Films directed by George Melford
American black-and-white films
Lost American films
American silent feature films
1918 lost films
Lost drama films
1910s American films